Oceanus is the personification of the world-ocean in Greek myth.

Oceanus may also refer to:

People
 Oceanus Hopkins (1620 – c. 1627), the only child born on the Mayflower during its historic voyage which brought the Pilgrims to America

Ships
 MTS ''Oceanos, a cruise ship which sank off South Africa's eastern coast on 4 August 1991
 RV Oceanus, a research vessel operated by the Woods Hole Oceanographic Institution
 USS Oceanus (ARB-2), a battle damage repair ship built for the United States Navy during World War II

Spacecraft
 Oceanus (Titan orbiter), a proposed orbiter mission to Saturn's moon Titan
 Oceanus (Uranus orbiter), a proposed orbiter named as an acronym for "Origins and Composition of the Exoplanet Analog Uranus System"

Geography
 Ocean in Latin, sometimes found on English maps
 Oceanus Procellarum, a vast lunar mare on the western edge of the near side of Earth's Moon
 Oceanus Borealis, a hypothesised ancient Martian ocean about the north pole of Mars

Films
Oceanus: Act One, a 2015 adventure, science fiction short film directed by Jeffrey Morris
Oceanus: Odyssey One, a 2019 adventure, science fiction film directed by Jeffrey Morris

Other
 Casio Oceanus, a line of wrist watches

See also
 World ocean
 Ocean (disambiguation)
 Oceanic (disambiguation)
 Oceania (disambiguation)